Aks is an Indian 2001 Hindi-language supernatural action thriller film directed by Rakeysh Omprakash Mehra, and starring Amitabh Bachchan, Raveena Tandon, and Manoj Bajpayee in leading roles. The music was composed by Anu Malik. Despite receiving mixed reviews from critics and being a box office flop, it won three awards at the 47th Filmfare Awards: Best Actor — Critics (Bachchan), Special Award Performance (Tandon), and Best Sound Design (Ranjan). Bachchan and Bajpayee were nominated for the Best Actor and Best Villain at the same ceremony as well.

Plot synopsis
Aks is a supernatural thriller centering on two characters― a cop named Manu Verma (Amitabh Bachchan) and a shadowy killer named Raghavan (Manoj Bajpayee). During a conference in Budapest, the defence minister is found murdered. Manu Verma investigates the case and discovers that the culprit is Raghavan Ghatge, a sociopathic serial killer who works as a hitman.

Raghavan is caught. As he is about to be executed by hanging, his spirit goes into Manu's body and starts to manipulate the cop into performing acts that Raghavan wanted to perform. But he couldn't save himself. He goes to another town but is not able to find peace.

Eventually, Raghavan's spirit leaves Manu's body. Everything seems to be normal. Manu & his family go on vacation. Unfortunately, Raghavan's spirit is still alive and possesses Manu's friend.

Cast
Amitabh Bachchan as Inspector Manu Verma
Raveena Tandon as Neeta
Manoj Bajpayee as Raghavan Ghatge
Nandita Das as Supriya Verma
K.K. Raina as Mahadevan Ghatge
Tanvi Azmi as Madhu Pradhan
Vineet Kumar as Narang
Pramod Moutho as Justice Balwant Chaudhry
Salim Ghouse as Blind Guru
Veerendra Saxena as Hanif Kasai
Vijay Raaz as Yeda Yakub
Vrajesh Hirjee as RAW Officer 1
Gajraj Rao as RAW Officer 2
Mithilesh Chaturvedi as PM's Aide
Amol Palekar as Minister

Production 
Aks is the directorial debut of Rakeysh Omprakash Mehra. Amitabh Bachchan sported a French beard to portray his character.

Music

A. R. Rahman was initially approached to compose original score and songs for the film. Rahman initially agreed and then opted out for reasons unknown. Rahman would later compose for Mehra's Rang De Basanti and Delhi 6. After Rahman walked out of the project, the original score was composed by Rahman's associate Ranjit Barot while the songs were composed by Anu Malik with lyrics penned by Gulzar. Sunder of Planet Bollywood praised the album for being experimental and creative in nature and gave it a rating of 9 out of 10. Sukanya Verma of Rediff appreciated the album saying that Aks is a "captivating album with funky, experimental, new age music".

Reception
 
The Hindu praised the cinematography and music of the film along with the acting performances of all actors, specially Amitabh Bachchan. Taran Adarsh of Bollywood Hungama praised the visuals and music of the film but criticized the film for being too complicated and slow. Taran gave the film a rating of 2 out of 5.

Awards and nominations

References

External links

2000s Hindi-language films
2001 films
2001 action thriller films
2000s supernatural horror films
Films scored by Anu Malik
Films directed by Rakeysh Omprakash Mehra
Indian action thriller films
Indian supernatural horror films
2001 directorial debut films